Maksym Averyanov (born 22 July 1997) is a Ukrainian professional footballer who plays as a midfielder for FC Zviahel.

Career
Averyanov is a product of the Cherkasy and RVUFK Kyiv School Systems.

He made his debut for FC Metalist in the match against FC Dynamo Kyiv on 1 March 2015 in the Ukrainian Premier League.

References

External links
 
 

1997 births
Living people
Piddubny Olympic College alumni
Ukrainian footballers
Association football midfielders
FC Metalist Kharkiv players
FC Zorya-Akademia Bilozirya players
FC Zirka Kropyvnytskyi players
FC Kremin Kremenchuk players
FC Cherkashchyna players
FC Dnipro Cherkasy players
FC Zvyahel Novohrad-Volynskyi players
Ukrainian Premier League players
Ukrainian First League players
Ukrainian Second League players
Ukrainian Amateur Football Championship players
Sportspeople from Cherkasy